BRCA1 pseudogene 1 is a protein that in humans is encoded by the BRCA1P1 gene.

References